The 2016 Ironman World Championship was a long distance triathlon competition that was held on October 8, 2016 in Kailua-Kona, Hawaii. It was won by Jan Frodeno of Germany and Daniela Ryf of Switzerland, both repeat champions from 2015. The race was the 40th edition of the Ironman World Championship, which has been held annually in Hawaii since 1978. The championship was organized by the World Triathlon Corporation (WTC) and awarded a total purse prize of $650,000.

Championship results

Men

Women

Qualification
The division of athletes was divided into professional, age group, physically challenged, hand cycle, and military divisions.

Professional
For entry into the 2016 World Championship race professional triathletes qualified for the championship through a point system. Points were earned by competing in WTC sanctioned Ironman and Ironman 70.3 events throughout the qualifying year. For the 2016 championship race that period was August 30, 2015 to August 21, 2016. The top 50 male and top 35 female pros in points at the end of the qualifying year qualified to race in Kona. An athlete's five highest scoring races were counted in the point totals. At least one Ironman race must have been completed and only three Ironman 70.3 races counted towards an athlete's overall point total. Prior champions of a WTC Championship received an automatic entry for the Championship race for a period of five years after their last championship performance provided that they competed in at least one full-distance Ironman race during the qualifying year. Additionally, winners of the five regional Ironman championships received automatic qualification into the 2016 Ironman Championship. All automatic entries awarded did not count toward the number of available qualifying spots. The available prize money to professional triathletes for qualifying races ranged from $25,000 to $150,000, depending on the event.

In July 2015, WTC announced a pilot program for separate professional men and women only events for races in 2016. On four different dates separate races will be held with only females in the professional field and only males in the professional field, for a total of eight different events. This impacted two dates during the 2016 championship qualifying year, July 24, where the professional women raced at Ironman Lake Placid and the professional men raced Ironman Canada and August 20/21 where the women competed at Ironman Sweden and the men at Ironman Copenhagen. The program is based partly on feedback from female professionals who have stated that slower professional men (who start prior to the women) and age group men (who start after) interfere with the women's racing and tactics.

Amateur
Amateur athletes could qualify through a single performance at an Ironman event. Slots were allocated to each amateur age group category, male and female, with the number of slots given out based on that category's proportional representation of the overall field. Each age group category was tentatively allocated one qualifying spot in each qualifying event.

Other means of entry into the championship race could also be obtained through Ironman's Legacy program, or through the Ironman’s charitable eBay auction. Handcycle competitors, who are paraplegic, quadriplegic or double above-the-knee amputees and use a hand cranked cycle on the bike segment and racing chair for the run segment could also qualify at Ironman 70.3 Cairns (one male/one female), Ironman 70.3 Luxembourg (two male/one female), and Ironman 70.3 Buffalo Springs Lake (one male/one female)

WTC offered an Executive Challenge program, named Ironman XC, that provided the chance to qualify for the championship race via other select Ironman events. Entry into the program was done through an application process.

In December 2014, WTC announced a newly created military division for active duty personnel. The division was open to any active personnel, regardless of country or gender. Slots were allocated in a similar fashion to the normal age group qualification process with age group categories set at 18-29, 30-39 and 40+ for each gender. Three races were announced, with two impacting the 2016 qualifying period: Ironman 70.3 Superfrog (14 slots) and Ironman Cairns (10 Slots).

Qualifying Ironman races

*Asia-Pacific Championship was moved from Melbourne to Cairns after local Melbourne officials canceled the race due to an F1 event on the same day.
x Amateur only competition.
m Professional men's field
w Professional women's field

References

External links
Ironman website
Professional Triathlete Qualifying Rules

Ironman World Championship
Sports competitions in Hawaii
Ironman
2016 in sports in Hawaii
Triathlon competitions in the United States